Belnaleck Art McMurroughs is a Gaelic Athletic Association club based in the village of Bellanaleck, County Fermanagh, Northern Ireland.

History
The club was founded in 1902, and won the Fermanagh Senior Football Championship in 1933, it remains their only senior triumph.

After winning the Junior title in 2017, Belnaleck defeated Down champions Dundrum and Doire Trasna of Derry to reach the final of the Ulster Junior Club Football Championship. Belnaleck lost the final by six points to Donegal's Naomh Colmcille.

Belnaleck completed back-to-back championship wins by defeating Irvinestown to win the Intermediate title in 2018.

Honours
 Fermanagh Senior Football Championship (1): 1933
 Fermanagh Intermediate Football Championship (3): 1967, 1974, 2018
 Fermanagh Junior Football Championship (4): 1953, 1956, 2009, 2017

References

Gaelic football clubs in County Fermanagh
Gaelic games clubs in County Fermanagh